Akranesvöllur is a multi-use stadium in Akranes, Iceland.  It is currently used mostly for football matches.  The stadium holds 4,850 and was built in 1935. It has 850 seats.

References

External links
 Norduralsvöllurinn - Nordic Stadiums

Football venues in Iceland
Íþróttabandalag Akraness
Sports venues completed in 1935